Slatiny is a municipality and village in Jičín District in the Hradec Králové Region of the Czech Republic. It has about 600 inhabitants.

Administrative parts
The village of Milíčeves is an administrative part of Slatiny.

References

Villages in Jičín District